Audrey Landers (born Audrey Hamburg; July 18, 1956) is an American actress and singer, best known for her role as Afton Cooper on the television series Dallas and her role as Val Clarke in the film version of A Chorus Line (1985).

Early years

Landers was born in Philadelphia, Pennsylvania. Landers began her acting career at the age of 9, when she starred in her first community theater musical, and continued acting and singing in community theater shows in New York State. In January 1970, she performed in Oh Dad, Poor Dad... at Elmwood Playhouse in Nyack, NY. Landers was first noticed with a country song that she wrote and performed at the age of twelve, which led to a Nashville recording contract with Epic Records, a performance on The Merv Griffin Show, and a year-long role on the daytime drama, The Secret Storm.

During her teen years, she acted on the daytime drama Somerset and studied music at the Juilliard School in New York City, while majoring in psychology at Columbia University. Her feature film debut came in The Tennessee Stallion (1978) with her sister, Judy.

Career
Landers moved to Los Angeles and on her 24th birthday, landed the role of Afton Cooper on Dallas, which she held for 78 episodes from 1981–84, and a further six episodes in 1989, for a total of 84 episodes. She also appeared in the television movie Dallas: J.R. Returns (1996). In the series, her character was a nightclub singer, performing all the songs that Audrey composed. Landers had already recorded two singles in the 1970s, but during her stint on Dallas, she recorded her first album, Little River (1983). She has since released over a dozen albums, mainly for European record companies, having written most of her hits.

After she left Dallas in 1984, she was cast by director Richard Attenborough as Val Clarke in the film version of A Chorus Line (1985). In 2013, she reprised her role of Afton Cooper in several episodes of the second season of the revival of Dallas.

Before joining Dallas, she guest-starred in numerous television series, including The Dukes of Hazzard, Fantasy Island, The Love Boat and Battlestar Galactica and appeared as a panelist on Match Game in 1979 and on Match Game-Hollywood Squares Hour in 1983-84. In the 1990s, she appeared in the television miniseries of Jackie Collins' Lucky Chances. From 1990–92, she played the role of Charlotte Hesser, eldest daughter of upstate Pennsylvania mob boss Carlo Hesser on the ABC daytime series One Life to Live.  She was also a frequent guest on the 1980s iterations of Pyramid, including leading a contestant to a $100,000 win in 1986.

With her young sons as inspiration, Landers created the children's television series, The Huggabug Club in 1996, for which, in addition to writing the scripts, she also wrote the 250+ original songs in the series. Her partner (and mother), Ruth Landers, produced the series and donated it to Public Television for its 5-year run. In 2006, she co-wrote, and co-directed the family adventure film, Circus Island, a Ruth Landers production. Landers and her mother have also created a fashion line called Landers STAR Collection which is gaining global popularity through QVC UK, and in Italy, Canada, Germany, and the U.S.

Landers has directed many music videos, as well as the feature film, Circus Island. She continues to perform her music in concerts and variety specials around the world. (Broadwayworld.com)

Personal life
Audrey is sister of actress Judy Landers, and has acted with her in several roles, including multiple episodes of The Love Boat as well as Circus Island and Ghost Writer, films produced by Ruth Landers. Audrey and Judy Landers were on the cover and in a non-nude pictorial of the January 1983 issue of Playboy.

Landers married businessman Donald Berkowitz in May 1988. They have two children, twins Adam and Daniel, born in 1993.

Selected filmography

Discography 

Albums
1983 Little River
1984 Holiday Dreams (European release)/Wo der Südwind weht (Germany release)
1985 Paradise Generation
1986 Country Dreams (European release)/Weites Land (Germany release)
1988 Secrets
1990 My Dreams For You (European release)/Meine Träume für dich (Germany release)
1991 Rendez-Vous
1991 Das Audrey Landers Weihnachtsalbum
2005 Spuren eines Sommers
2006 Dolce Vita
2010: Spuren Deiner Zärtlichkeit

Singles
1978 Apple Don't Fall Far From the Tree
1979 You Thrill Me
1983 Manuel Goodbye
1983 Little River
1983 Playa Blanca
1984 Mi Amor (Camilo Sesto)
1984 Honeymoon In Trinidad
1985 Paradise Generation
1985 Jim, Jeff & Johnny
1985 Lucky
1985 "Reunited" Duet with Tom Jones
1985 Summernight In Rome
1986 These Silver Wings
1986 Yellow Rose of Texas
1986 Tennessee Nights
1987 Bella Italia
1988 Silverbird
1988 Never Wanna Dance (When I'm Blue)
1989 Gone With the Wind
1989 Sun of Jamaica
1990 Shine a Light
1990 Shadows of Love
1991 Santa Maria Goodbye
1991 Monte Carlo
1997 Heute habe ich an dich gedacht (with Bernhard Brink)
2004 Weil wir alle die gleiche Sonne sehen (with son Daniel)
2005 Sommernacht am Lago Maggiore
2006 In deinen Augen lag Dolce Vita
2007 Sommertraum
2009 "Weihnachten" (Christmas Time)
2009: Sommer, Meer und Sonnenschein
2010 "One Star" (Ein Stern)
2011 "Haïti Chérie"
2011 "Remember Yesterday" (An Jenem Tag)

Charts

Albums

Singles

References

External links 

 
 Fashion Collection
 
 http://www.instagram.com/AudreyLandersOfficial 
 
 

1956 births
Living people
Actresses from Philadelphia
American women singers
American film actresses
American soap opera actresses
American television actresses
Musicians from Philadelphia
People from Rockland County, New York
Singers from Pennsylvania
21st-century American women
American expatriate actresses in the United Kingdom